Jane F. Gardner (1934 – 28 January 2023) was a British Roman historian, academic, and museum curator. She was emerita professor of Roman History at University of Reading, specialising in Roman law and Roman social history. She was a professor at the university from 1993 until her retirement in 1999, having taught there since 1963. She was curator of the Ure Museum of Greek Archaeology from 1976 to 1992.

Career 
Gardner studied Classics at the University of Glasgow. She was awarded the Cowan Blackstone Medal in 1953, and graduated with an MA in 1955. From there she went on to study Literae Humaniores at Lady Margaret Hall, Oxford, graduating in 1962. From 1962 to 1963 she taught Greek and Roman History at University College, Cardiff (now Cardiff University), followed by two years teaching Classics and English at Forest Fields Grammar School in Nottingham.

Gardner joined the Classics Department at the University of Reading in 1963, at first as a part-time lecturer. Over the following 36 years she was promoted several times, becoming assistant lecturer in 1964, lecturer in 1966, senior lecturer in 1988 and finally professor in 1993. In that time she held a Leverhulme Trust Research fellowship (1995–96) and was also curator of the Ure Museum of Greek Archaeology (1976–92).

Between 1976 and 1979, Gardner was a member of the Council of the Society for the Promotion of Roman Studies.

Research 
Gardner published extensively on the Roman family, Roman property law, the legal status of individuals, and the role of slaves and freedmen in Roman society. Her three monographs (Women in Roman Law and Society (1986), Being a Roman Citizen (1993) and Family and Familia in Roman Law and Life (1998)) have had a significant impact on the fields of Roman legal and social history. Reviewers praised these books for presenting often difficult and complicated legal material in readable and accessible ways. These monographs remain the most important works on their subjects, and earned her a D.Litt. from the University of Oxford in 1999.

Gardner also produced a revised translation of Julius Caesar's Gallic War (1983), as well as a new translation of his Civil War (1976).

Later life and death
Gardner retired and became an emerita professor in 1999. For three years after her retirement (until 2002) she was special professor at the University of Nottingham, helping to develop the International Centre for the History of Slavery (now the Institute for the Study of Slavery). She continued to write and publish on Roman law and society, especially on slavery, and continued to review books in The Classical Review.

Gardner died on 28 January 2023, at the age of 88.

Selected publications 
 Gardner, Jane F. 1986. Women in Roman Law and Society. Croom Helm
 Gardner, Jane F., Weidemann T. 1991. The Roman Household: a Sourcebook. Routledge
 Gardner, Jane F. 1993. Being a Roman Citizen. Routledge
 Gardner, Jane F. 1998. Family and Familia in Roman Law and Life. Clarendon Press
 Weidemann, T., Gardner, Jane F. 2002 Representing the Body of the Slave. Frank Cass

References 

1934 births
2023 deaths
British classical scholars
Women classical scholars
British women historians
Alumni of the University of Glasgow
Alumni of Lady Margaret Hall, Oxford
British curators